Medenychi is an urban-type settlement in Drohobych Raion (district) of Lviv Oblast (region) in Western Ukraine. It hosts the administration of Medenychi settlement hromada, one of the hromadas of Ukraine. Population: . Local government is administered by Medenychi village council.

History
The territory was occupied by Germans in early July 1941.
Once the territory was occupied by Germans, pogroms against the Jewish community were carried out by locals and continued till spring 1942. In August 1942, most of the Medenychi Jews were sent to the Bełżec extermination camp. According to the Soviet archives and testimonies gathered by Yahad-In Unum, the column of Jews was shot midway between Medenychi and Hirske (Gorskoye). The Jews were shot in small groups in the clay pit, located close to the road. The execution was carried out by Germans.

References

External links
 СМТ Меденичі

Urban-type settlements in Drohobych Raion
Holocaust locations in Ukraine